The 40th Slavonia Division (Serbo-Croatian Latin: Četrdeseta slavonska divizija) was a Yugoslav Partisan division formed on 15 July 1944. It was formed from the 16th Youth Brigade and 18th Slavonia Brigade. The division was part of the 6th Corps and it mostly fought in Slavonia region. Commander of the division until December 1944 was Veljko Kovačević, after him Savo Miljanović served as the commander.

References 

Divisions of the Yugoslav Partisans
Military units and formations established in 1944